HŽ series 7022 is a class of low-floor diesel multiple unit built for Croatian Railways by Croatia based company TŽV Gredelj. The prototype of diesel electric multiple unit for regional traffic is a 3-part train set composed of two end motor modules containing driver's cab and one middle motor module without driver's cab. All the modules are supported by two bogies, one of which is a drive bogie and the other one a running bogie. All drive equipment is situated on the roof of a module. On module roofs are mounted diesel generator groups with belonging converters, which supply and control the operation of electric drive motors situated in the bogie. In the door area of a module containing driver's cab there are installed toilet facilities, with one of them adapted for disabled persons in wheelchairs. Passenger and driver compartments of the train are fully air conditioned. Passenger compartment is equipped with a system for audio and video information for the passengers and free wireless internet (WiFi) is also provided.

Main technical specifications 

 Gauge: 1435 mm 
 Axle arrangement:  Bo’2’+2’Bo’+2’Bo’'
 Seating capacity: 209 
 Standing capacity: 201
 Doors: 8
 Door width: 1300 mm
 Floor height: 570/600/875 mm
 Overall length: 70.45 m
 Vehicle width: 2885 mm
 Vehicle height: 4280 mm
 Maximum weight: 170 t
 Continuous power (on wheel):  1390 kW
 Starting traction force: 125 kN
 Maximum speed: 160 km/h

References

External links
 Low floor diesel multiple unit for regional transport (TŽV Gredelj)

7022